Helcystogramma klimeschi is a moth in the family Gelechiidae. It is found in Italy.

References

Moths described in 2001
klimeschi
Moths of Europe